Stadio Porta Elisa is a multi-use stadium in Lucca, Italy. The authorized capacity is 7,386, but it can hold about 12,000; 2,500 of them are covered.

History

The stadium was named after , a gate in the east of the historic walls of Lucca, named after Elisa Baciocchi Bonaparte.

It is currently used mostly for football matches and is the home ground of A.S. Lucchese-Libertas.

External links
Club Website

Porta Elisa
S.S.D. Lucchese 1905
Buildings and structures in Lucca
Sports venues in Tuscany
Porta